The Dumalla is a type of turban worn by Sikhs. This turban is worn mainly by Sikhs who are initiated into the Khalsa, through participating in the Amrit Sanchar but can be worn by all Sikhs.  The word Dumalla means "Du" meaning two and "Malla" meaning cloth or fabric. This is because there will usually be one fabric to form the base of the turban and a second to wrap around the base to form the turban itself. There many different types of Dumalla, in many different sizes and colours.

Symbolism
The Dumalla style may trace its origin to Fateh Singh, the youngest son of Guru Gobind Singh. The Dumalla itself was worn by many of the Sikh Gurus, thus many Sikhs also adopted the Dumalla. During the era of Mughal rule many Mughals would wear turbans as a crown to show they were of royal stature and was seen as a symbol of noble authority, whereas the poor and those who were not Muslim were not allowed to wear turbans, leading to oppression and inequality during the rule. Sikh Gurus, most notably starting with Guru Arjan Dev, seeing this took a stand against this and said "If the Mughals wear one turban, we will wear two" to show that they would stand against the oppression and tyranny of that age. Since then, Sikhs have been wearing the Dumalla as part of practicing their way of life.

Styles

Modern Dumalla
This is the turban many Sikhs who wear the Dumalla will adorn. There will usually be a base made with the hair wrapped into a bun through being twisted into a cloth to form the base or forming a bun and then covering with a cloth. It is generally tied in the way that the first layer goes over the right ear to the left top side of the base in a diagonal wrap and the same follows with the over the left ear to the right top side of the base and the third wrap going from the right ear to the top in a horizontal wrap across the top of the eyebrows. The rest of the turban is tied following the same pattern as the third wrap, being wrapped above each additional wrap until it reaches the top of turban and the extra cloth is tucked in between the existing wraps.

Chand Tora
This is a warrior style turban which was worn by Sikhs in battle. The "Chand" is a metal symbol consisting of a crescent sword and a double edged sword, it is held in place at the front of the turban by the "Tora" which is woven chainmail cord tied in a pattern within the turban to protect the head from slashing weapons. This type of turban is generally worn by Nihang Singhs.

Gol

"Gol" means round and so this is the round dumalla, frequently called the "gol dastaar". This can also be tied with a base but instead of diagonal wraps, this turban is tied going around the head with each wrap going above the last. This is generally the simplest type of dumalla to tie and was popularised mainly by the leaders of Damdami Taksaal, the walking university of Sikhism such as Jarnail Singh and Sant Kartar Singh. Also as well as many Nanaksar.

References

Headgear
Sikh religious clothing
Indian headgear
Nihang